The Official Handbook of the Marvel Universe is an encyclopedic guide which details the fictional universe featured in Marvel Comics publications. The original 15-volume series was published in comic book format in 1982, followed by sporadic updates.

Origin
Jim Shooter, Marvel's then editor-in-chief, conceived of the idea, envisioning a guide detailing statistics much in the manner of those found upon the backs of baseball cards. This initial project was to be called The Marvel Super-Specifications Handbook (the eventual title incorporating the term "Marvel Universe" was appropriated from Al Milgrom, who had used it as a working title for the anthology series Marvel Fanfare). Shooter appointed Mark Gruenwald editor of the project, and Gruenwald developed the project to include all aspects of the Marvel Universe, although he noted it was not comprehensive. In addition to Gruenwald, contributing writers on the initial volume were Marvel editors Mike Carlin, Eliot R. Brown, and Peter Sanderson. Josef Rubinstein was brought on by Gruenwald to be the sole inker of the entire 20-year project because he felt Rubinstein was best able to make the characters easily recognizable and to subvert his own style to that of the handbook's various pencillers.

Critics of the Handbook have argued that the level of detail within the guide effectively limited the ability of writers to innovate, a charge Gruenwald dismissed, reputedly stating that the information presented was only the most recent data and was subject to change. Sanderson, one of the writers of the original guide, noted that "Mark sought to make the Marvel characters' super-powers as firm a basis in real science as possible. After the first version of the Handbook, Mark decided that some of the explanations had grown too complicated, and asked me to simplify them."

The OHOTMU detailed the more significant characters, items and locations in the Marvel Universe, itemizing them into individual entries. Individual entries usually consisted of:
 A frontal full-body view of the character.
 Prose text describing the character's origin, powers, and other abilities and unique traits, as well as "statistics" such as place of birth, former aliases, height, weight, hair and eye color and so forth. The original edition opted only to describe the "origins" of characters (how they acquired their powers), instead focusing heavily on detailed explanations for how those powers functioned. In the Book of the Dead supplement, however, the handbook provided entire "histories" for the deceased characters, a trend which was then adopted for the main body of the Deluxe Edition, allowing the entire life and career of the characters to be covered. Major important pieces of equipment were also given technical illustrations with breakdowns of their functions and features.
 Example images of the character in action, taken directly from the comics themselves.

In the original, characters were listed at one character to a page, although minor characters were sometimes listed at two to a page and major characters would occasionally receive more than one page. In the Deluxe Edition, however, every character received at least one page, with significant characters receiving up to 3-5 pages. Both editions had wraparound covers that could be linked together to form a giant poster. In the late 1980s, a poster made up of the first twelve issues of the original Handbook was released. For the poster, several characters were added and others received up-to-date looks.

In the Master Edition (1990–1993) this changed and every character was allocated a double-sided loose leaf page. Later versions allocate characters different lengths of entry depending on their history and importance.

Publication history
There have been several versions of the concept since it was first published in 1982:

 1982-1984: a 15-issue series. Issues #13-14 are titled the Book of the Dead and Inactive, featuring characters and groups who were, at the time, believed dead or inactive. Issue #15 is titled the Book of Weapons, Hardware, and Paraphernalia, featuring technical drawings of equipment such as Captain America's shield and Spider-Man's web shooters. One issue of the series (#9) can be seen in the movie Explorers.
 1985-1988: a 20-issue Deluxe Edition is published; technical drawings of equipment are incorporated into individual characters' entries. Although numerous entries reference an Appendix, the Deluxe Edition Appendix is not published. This run was also collected in trade paperback format, in a series of 10 128-page volumes. The trade edition also feature updates of many characters. Supplements for licensed properties are published, including Conan the Barbarian, G.I. Joe, and the Transformers.
 1989: An additional eight-issue supplement to the Deluxe Edition, denoted Update '89 on the cover, is published. This series covers primarily new characters and is notable for including numerous non-superhumans. This series also sported wraparound covers but, unlike previous versions, these did not link together.
 1990-1993: A 36-issue Master Edition series is published, with each issue a shrink-wrapped pack of loose-leaf pages. A three-ring vinyl binder was also released for the pages to be inserted into.
 2004-2005: Themed one-shot supplements are published, such as Official Handbook to the Marvel Universe: X-Men 2004. Other entries in this themed, subtitled series include Spider-Man 2004; Avengers 2004; Hulk 2004; Daredevil 2004; Wolverine 2004; Golden Age 2004; Women of Marvel 2005 and Avengers 2005.
 2006: A new 12-issue series, the All-New OHOTMU A-Z, was published featuring new characters. A series of themed one-shot issues was also published in the same style as the 2004-2005 books, including Civil War Files which tied in with Marvel's Civil War crossover series. The original Handbook, original 20-issue Deluxe Edition, and the Update '89 edition were also reprinted in five Essential volumes.
 2007: Four A-Z Update issues, six themed issues (including World War Hulk: Gamma Files and X-Men: Messiah Complex - Mutant Files) and the first issue of the Marvel Atlas are published.
 2008: All material from 2004-2007 is updated and printed in the Official Handbook of the Marvel Universe A-Z Premiere HC set, divided into 14 volumes (each containing 240 pages). The second issue of the Marvel Atlas is published. Other publications included Ultimate Secrets, All-New Iron Manual, Secret Invasion: Skrulls!, and Amazing Spider-Man: Brand New Day Yearbook.
 2009: The Official Handbook of the Marvel Universe A-Z Premiere HC set continued publication. A sister project to the Handbook, the Official Index to the Marvel Universe monthly series, began publication in January. Other forthcoming titles include Dark Reign Files and Wolverine: Weapon X Files.

Bibliography of Official Handbook series

The Official Handbook of the Marvel Universe Vol. I

The Official Handbook of the Marvel Universe Vol. II (Deluxe Edition)

The Official Handbook of the Marvel Universe Vol. III (Master Edition)

The Official Handbook of the Marvel Universe Vol. IV

Bibliography of other handbook titles

Gamer's Handbook of the Marvel Universe

Marvel Encyclopedias

Marvel Fact Files

Marvel Fact Files are a series of encyclopedic guides which detail the fictional universe featured in Marvel Comics publications. The magazine series is published in the U.K. by Eaglemoss Publications starting in 2013.

Reception
Lawrence Henry Apodaca reviewed the original The Official Handbook of the Marvel Universe in Space Gamer No. 64. Apodaca commented that "Non-comic collectors should be able to find copies at stores which carry back issues - and should look for them. They are a valuable aid to science fiction or superhero RPGs."

See also
 The Classic Marvel Figurine Collection
 List of Marvel Comics characters
 List of Marvel Comics teams and organizations
 List of Marvel Comics publications
 Official Marvel Index
 Who's Who in the DC Universe

References

External links
 OHOTMU at the Marvel Universe
 Appendix to the Handbook of the Marvel Universe
 Who Watches the Watchers OHOTMU Discussion Forum
 Jeff Christiansen's Master List
 Marvel Catalog at Marvel.com

Marvel Comics titles
1982 comics debuts
Marvel Comics encyclopedias
Magazines about comics
20th-century encyclopedias
21st-century encyclopedias